Stanislav Stanislavovich Shushkevich (15 December 1934 – 3 May 2022) was a Belarusian politician and scientist. From 25 August 1991 to 26 January 1994, he was the first head of state of independent Belarus after it seceded from the Soviet Union, serving as Chairman of the Supreme Soviet (also called chairman of Parliament or president). He supported social democratic reforms and played a key role in the creation of the Commonwealth of Independent States.

As a scientist, he was a corresponding member of the Belarusian Academy of Sciences, Doctor in Physics and Mathematics, recipient of various state awards, professor and the author and originator of textbooks and over 150 articles and 50 inventions.

Biography
Shushkevich was born on 15 December 1934, in Minsk. His parents were teachers who came from peasant families. His father, poet Stanislau Petrovich Shushkevich (born 19 February 1908 in Minsk) was arrested in the 1930s and was released from prison in 1956 (but completely exonerated only in 1975). His mother, writer Helena Romanowska was ethnically Polish and her family had szlachta (noble) roots. During World War II Shushkevich lived with his mother and grandmother in Nazi-occupied Minsk, with a Jewish boy hiding in their house.

After finishing school with a medal in 1951, he entered the Faculty of Physics and Mathematics of the Belarusian State University and graduated in 1956. He subsequently studied at the graduate school of the Institute of Physics of the Belarusian Academy of Sciences, conducting research in the field of radio electronics.

In the early 1960s, while working as an engineer in an electronics factory, he was in charge of teaching Russian language to Lee Harvey Oswald  when Oswald lived in Minsk. This is confirmed by a CIA document, RIF #104-10014-10053. 

He was married to his wife Irina from  1976 onward. According to him, she forced him to start a healthy lifestyle. He had a son named Stanislav and daughter named Elena. Shushkevich was admitted to hospital and placed in an intensive care unit in April 2022, due to complications from COVID-19. On the night of 3 May, Shushkevich died in Minsk.

Political activity

When Supreme Soviet chairman Mikalay Dzyemyantsyey was ousted for his support of the August 1991 coup attempt, Shushkevich became interim speaker, and presided over Belarus voting to secede from the Soviet Union. He thus became the newly minted nation's first leader. On 18 September, Shushkevich was elected Chairman of the Supreme Soviet.

On 8 December 1991, in Belavezhskaya Pushcha and together with the leaders of Russia (Boris Yeltsin) and Ukraine (Leonid Kravchuk), he signed a declaration that the Soviet Union was dissolved and replaced by the Commonwealth of Independent States; the declaration later became known as the "Belovezh Accords".

Shushkevich had  the vestigial Soviet nuclear arsenal (both tactical and strategic) withdrawn from Belarus, without preconditions or compensation from Russia or the West. However, other reforms became stalled due to the opposition from a hostile parliament as well as from Prime Minister Vyacheslav Kebich.

In late 1993, Alexander Lukashenko, the then-chairman of the anti-corruption committee of the Belarusian parliament, accused 70 senior government officials, including Shushkevich, of corruption, including stealing state funds for personal purposes. Lukashenko's accusations forced a vote of confidence, which Shushkevich lost. Shushkevich was replaced by Vyacheslav Kuznetsov and later by Myechyslau Hryb.

In July 1994 the first direct presidential elections were held in Belarus. Six candidates stood, including Lukashenko, Shushkevich and Kebich, with the latter regarded as the clear favorite. In the first round Lukashenko won 45% of the vote against 17% for Kebich, 13% for Paznyak and 10% for Shushkevich.

In 2002 Shushkevich sued the Belarusian Ministry of Labor and Social Security: due to inflation, his retirement pension as a former head of state was the equivalent of US$1.80 monthly. To earn income, Shushkevich lectured extensively in foreign universities including in Poland, the United States and Asian countries.

In 2004 he attempted to participate in parliamentary elections, but was refused registration by the electoral commission.

He continued to be active in politics, heading the Belarusian Social Democratic Assembly party from 1998 until 2018.

Awards and decorations
 
1982, Honored Worker of Science and Technology of the BSSR
1997, Polish Prize of Jan Nowak-Jeziorański
6 July 2010, Lithuanian presidential Order of Vytautas the Great, "for active support of the independence of Lithuania in 1991"
2012, Truman-Reagan Medal of Freedom
2018, Belarusian Democratic Republic 100th Jubilee Medal, "for contribution to the Belarusian democracy and independence"

References

External links

1934 births
2022 deaths
Politicians from Minsk
Scientists from Minsk
Members of the Supreme Council of Belarus
Presidents of Belarus
Soviet engineers
Belarusian people of Polish descent
Belarusian Roman Catholics
Belarusian Social Democratic Assembly politicians
Candidates for President of Belarus
Belarusian State University alumni
Deaths from the COVID-19 pandemic in Belarus